Diventerà Bellissima (lit. "[Sicily] Will Become Very Beautiful") is a regionalist and conservative political party active in Sicily, Italy. The party is led by Nello Musumeci, the former President of Sicily and current Minister for Civil Protection and Marine Policies, who is also affiliated to Brothers of Italy.

The party's name was inspired by a statement about Sicily of Paolo Borsellino, an Italian judge and prosecuting magistrate killed by the Mafia in 1992.

History
Diventerà Bellissima was founded in November 2014 by Nello Musumeci, former MEP and President of Catania Province and Fabio Granata, former Vice President of Sicily.

In the 2017 Sicilian regional election, the party won 6.0% of the vote and 6 seats in the Regional Assembly, contributing to elect Musumeci at the head of the regional government. Few months later, on 18 December, DB had its constituent congress in Palermo, in which Nello Musumeci was elected president and Raffaele Stancanelli, coordinator.

The party run in the 2018 general election within Brothers of Italy (FdI), a national conservative party led by Giorgia Meloni. In the election, Stancanelli succeeded in being elected in the Senate, thus he left his role as coordinator. On 24 February 2019, he was replaced by Gino Ioppolo during the second party's congress.

In 2022 joined the Brothers of Italy party and Musumeci became minister of the Meloni Cabinet.

Electoral results

Italian Parliament

Sicilian Regional Assembly

References

Notes

Political parties in Sicily
Regionalist parties in Italy
Political parties established in 2017